The Pancretan Association of America is an ethnic fraternal association in the United States and Canada for people of Cretan Greek ancestry.

History 

A number of local Cretan organizations had been established in the United States in the 1910s and 1920s, such as the Omonia in New York City, Arkadi of Pittsburgh and Epimenides of San Francisco. On April 7, 1929 these groups met at the Omonia in New York to set up a preparatory committee to found a general federation of Cretan clubs. On October 14 of that year a convention was held in Chicago with representatives of the above groups as well as the Cretan Fraternity of Chicago, Minos of Salt Lake City, Psilorites of Detroit, Mutual Benefit of Cleveland and Minos of Chicopee. The delegates founded the Pancretan Association of America. KPHTH the newsletter of Omonia was adopted as the national publication. Women's were established the following years in several cities.  By 2010 several of the women's chapters merged with their local men's chapters.  In 2015 there are only 8 women's chapters.  In 1948 a movement began to organize Cretan Youth chapters.  The organization was informal and by the late 1950s only one youth chapter (in New York City) remained.  A second revival of youth chapters began in 1970 and the Pancretan Youth Association (PYA) was formally established in 1971.  By 2015 there were 14 active PYA chapters.

Organization 

The operating headquarters is the location of the president.  A national convention meets every two years; in the interim it has elected officers and a board of directors. In June 2015 the association had 3,100 members in 78 local chapters, including youth and women's chapters in seven districts.

The Pancretan Association is an association of chapters.  Members of a chapter are automatically, in effect, members of the association.  For most all chapters, a membership is open to "individuals of Cretan lineage and their spouses."  However, a few chapters do allow "friends of Crete," usually limited to 5 percent of the total membership, to be full members, while some of these chapters do not permit such members to be president.

Purpose 

The primary purpose is to maintain and promote the Cretan culture and values, and to a lesser extent, the modern Greek culture, among its members here in America.  The programs to accomplish this are centered on philanthropy and on education.  The association has a large scholarship program and grants thousands of dollars annually to educational and philanthropic institutions and programs in Crete and the United States.

References

External links 
 

Culture of Crete
Ethnic fraternal orders in the United States
Greek-Canadian culture
Greek-American culture
Organizations established in 1929